Welcome is an unincorporated community located in Butler County, Kentucky, United States.

References

Unincorporated communities in Butler County, Kentucky
Unincorporated communities in Kentucky